Bang Pakok is a khwaeng (subdistrict) of Rat Burana District, in Bangkok, Thailand. In 2020, it had a total population of 47,638 people.

References

Subdistricts of Bangkok
Rat Burana district